Lisel Alamilla is a conservationist and politician from Belize. In 2012, Alamilla was appointed as a senator and member of the Belize Cabinet as Minister of Forestry, Fisheries & Sustainable Development. She served until 2015.  Alamilla won the 2012 Whitley Award for Inspirational Conservational Leadership.

Early life and education 
Lisel Alamilla was born on September 5, 1967, her parents are Maclovio Alamilla and Rose Magda Alamilla. She has four siblings Luis, Giovanni, Tania and Eder++.  She was born Belize City. As a child she lived in Belize City and Benque Viejo del Carmen. Alamilla earned a master's degree in Conservation Social Science from the University of Idaho College of Natural Resources in 1995. She earned her bachelor's degree in 1993 from Northeastern Illinois University. She is a graduate from Saint John's Junior College and Saint Catherine's Academy, an all girls high school.

Lisel Alamilla was the executive director of the Ya’axché Conservation Trust from 2008 until 2012, where she worked to protect the Mayan Golden Landscape in southern Belize.  Prior to her job at Ya’axché, Alamilla worked at Fauna and Flora International as Country Director for Belize. In 2012, Alamilla won the Whitley Award for Inspirational Conservational Leadership from the Whitney Fund for Nature.

Political career 
In 2012, Alamilla was appointed as a senator and member of the Belize Cabinet as Minister of Forestry, Fisheries & Sustainable Development by Prime Minister, Dean Barrow. With new appointments by Barrow in November 2015, Alamilla is no longer a senator or Belize Cabinet Minister.

In November 2015 Alamilla was appointed to establish and Chair the Toledo Maya Land Rights Commission which is tasked to implement in consultation with the Maya people or their representative the Consent Order, which aims to develop the legislative, administrative and governance framework to recognize Maya customary land tenure is the Toledo District, Belize.

References 

1967 births
Living people
People from Belize City
United Democratic Party (Belize) politicians
Government ministers of Belize
Members of the Senate (Belize)
Women government ministers of Belize
21st-century women politicians
Conservationists
University of Idaho alumni
Northeastern Illinois University alumni
People from Benque Viejo del Carmen